Jan-Lennard Struff was the defending champion but chose not to defend his title.

Jürgen Zopp won the title after defeating Tommy Robredo 6–3, 6–2 in the final.

Seeds

Draw

Finals

Top half

Bottom half

References
Main Draw
Qualifying Draw

TEAN International - Singles
2017 Singles